Parkeville is an unincorporated community in Greene Township, Parke County, in the U.S. state of Indiana.

History
Parkeville was platted in 1837. The community took its name from Parke County. A post office was established as Parkville in 1852, and remained in operation until it was discontinued in 1902.

Geography

References

Unincorporated communities in Parke County, Indiana
Unincorporated communities in Indiana